"Moanin'" is a composition by Bobby Timmons, first recorded by Art Blakey's band the Jazz Messengers for the album of the same title that was released by Blue Note Records.

Composition
"Moanin has a call and response melody. One account of its creation was given by Benny Golson, the tenor saxophonist in Blakey's band: Timmons had the opening eight bars, which he often played between tunes, but formed the complete song only after Golson encouraged him to add a bridge. It is played in F minor.

Recordings and reception
"Moanin was first recorded, by Art Blakey's band the Jazz Messengers, on October 30, 1958, with Lee Morgan on trumpet, Benny Golson on tenor sax, Bobby Timmons on piano, and Jymie Merritt on bass. It has been recorded numerous times and has become a jazz standard. Gary Giddins stated that the song "set the music world on its ear" and that it was "part of the funky, back to roots movement that Horace Silver, Mingus, and Ray Charles helped, in different ways, to fan". Jon Hendricks later added lyrics, and the subsequent recording by Lambert, Hendricks, and Ross made the song even more popular.

References

External links
 "Moanin'" at JazzStandards.com

1950s jazz standards
1958 songs
Compositions by Bobby Timmons
Songs with lyrics by Jon Hendricks
Jazz compositions in F minor